Jaroslav Tomáš (10 February 1949 – 5 March 2016) was a Czech volleyball player. He competed at the 1972 Summer Olympics and the 1976 Summer Olympics.

References

External links
 

1949 births
2016 deaths
Czech men's volleyball players
Olympic volleyball players of Czechoslovakia
Volleyball players at the 1972 Summer Olympics
Volleyball players at the 1976 Summer Olympics
People from Kelč
Sportspeople from the Zlín Region